Hot R&B/Hip-Hop Songs is a chart that ranks the top-performing R&B and hip hop music in the United States, published by Billboard magazine. In 2003, 13 different songs topped the chart in 51 issues of the magazine, based on weekly airplay data from R&B and hip hop music radio stations compiled by Nielsen Broadcast Data Systems.

Chart history

See also
2003 in music
List of number-one R&B hits (United States)

References

Citations

Book sources 

 

2003
United States RandB
2003 in American music